When in Rome are an English synth-pop/new wave group, which originally consisted of vocalists Clive Farrington and Andrew Mann, and keyboardist Michael Floreale. They are best known for their 1988 single "The Promise", which was their only top 40 hit on the Billboard Hot 100 in the US. As of July 2012, there were two bands using the When in Rome name, although the original lineup has been disbanded since 1990.

History

Formation
Michael Floreale and Andy O'Connell were recruited by Clive Farrington to replace departed members of his Manchester-based group Beau Leisure. Floreale and Farrington began to write songs together. Later, Farrington and Floreale saw Andrew Mann, a beat poet, and had him join their performances. O'Connell left the group; the remaining trio recorded some demos – sometimes including Mann's friend Corinne Drewery of Swing Out Sister – while seeking a recording deal. Farrington and Floreale came up with the band name after using the famous proverb to note the cultural differences between Manchester and London. The band was signed to Elektra Records for a month before the label closed its London office, forcing the band to leave due to the time difference with the U.S.

Debut album
The band was signed to Virgin UK subsidiary 10 Records, and their self-titled debut album was released on 3 May 1988. Producers Ben Rogan (who had worked with Sade) and Richard James Burgess took special interest in the trio's song "The Promise", issued first as a 12" dance disc. When the song became popular, hitting the top of Billboards Dance Club Play chart, Virgin ordered an album. A remixed version of "The Promise" was the album's first single. It was an instant success, barely missing the top ten in the United States, peaking at No. 11. Months later, the trio reached Billboards pop chart's lower reaches for the last time with "Heaven Knows" (No. 95, 1990). Additional singles did little on the charts, and the group ultimately faded away.

Breakup, reformation, and legal issues
In 1990, Floreale was fired by Farrington and Mann over creative differences and When in Rome disbanded shortly after Virgin Records dropped them in 1993. Floreale moved to the United States, and now lives in Dallas, Texas, where he composes music for television and film. Tensions arose between the members again in 2003, when "The Promise" was used in the 2004 film Napoleon Dynamite and Floreale made sole claim to the song, despite the trio receiving equal royalties.

Floreale reformed the band in 2006 with vocalist and guitarist John Ceravolo under the name "When in Rome II". Since then, the band has toured the United States and South America with various other 1980s groups. Farrington and Mann reformed in 2009, under the name "When in Rome UK". Floreale, however, had trademarked the name "When in Rome" in 2010, which was unsuccessfully challenged by Farrington and Mann. According to a Pollstar article in May 2011, the US trademark has been acknowledged: "In order to comply with the legal claim, the UK members, are billed as "Clive Farrington and Andrew Mann formerly of When In Rome" for U.S. gigs. In addition, Floreale filed an infringement claim against Rob Juarez, an associate of Farrington and Mann who attempted to trademark his tribute band name "When in Rome Revisited".

Present day
On 10 May 2016, Farrington, with Pat Flanagan, published his autobiography Confessions of a One Hit Wonder: "The Promise" ... And the Aftermath.

As of 2019, When in Rome UK performs in the U.S. as "Farrington+Mann Original Members of When in Rome UK".

In 2019, When In Rome II reformed with former Ultravox singer and Enuff Z'Nuff guitarist, Tony Fennell.

In 2020, Farrington+Mann, in collaboration with the City of Prague Philharmonic Orchestra and Slovenia Symphonic Film Orchestra, released a 30th anniversary orchestral edition of their hit song "The Promise" on both CD and vinyl.

Members

Original line-up (1987–1990)
Clive Farrington – vocals
Andrew Mann – vocals
Michael Floreale – keyboards

When in Rome II (2006–present)
Michael Floreale – keyboards
Tony Fennell – vocals, guitar
Chris Willett – drums

When in Rome UK (2009–present)
Clive Farrington – vocals
Andrew Mann – vocals
Rob Juarez – drums

Discography

Studio albums

Singles

See also
 List of number-one dance hits (United States)
 List of artists who reached number one on the US Dance chart

References

External links
 (When in Rome II)

English new wave musical groups
British synth-pop new wave groups
British musical trios
Musical groups from Manchester
Musical groups established in 1987
Virgin Records artists
English synth-pop groups